Captain's wood snake (Xylophis captaini), also known commonly as Captain's xylophis, is a species of snake in the family Pareidae. The species is endemic to India.

Geographic range
The holotype of X. captaini is from Kanam, Kottayam district, in the state of Kerala and was found in 2000. Captain's wood snake has been recorded at low altitudes on the western side of the southern part of the Western Ghats, south of the Palakkad Gap.

Habitat

Description
A small species of snake, X. captaini does not exceed  in total length (including tail).

Behavior

Diet
X. captaini preys predominantly on earthworms.

Reproduction
X. captaini is oviparous.

Etymology
The specific name, captaini, and the common names, Captain's wood snake and Captain's xylophis, are in honor of Indian herpetologist Ashok Captain for his work on Indian snakes.

References

Further reading
Deepak V, Ruane S, Gower DJ (2018). "A new subfamily of fossorial colubroid snakes from the Western Ghats of peninsular India". Journal of Natural History 52 (45–46): 2919–2934. (Xylophiinae, new subfamily).
Palot MJ (2015). "A checklist of reptiles of Kerala, India". Journal of Threatened Taxa 7 (13): 8010–8022.

Pareidae
Snakes of Asia
Reptiles of India
Endemic fauna of the Western Ghats
Fauna of Kerala
Reptiles described in 2007